St Luke's Church  was an Anglican parish church in the Cheetham Hill district of Manchester, England. The structure is now mostly derelict.

The church of St Luke was a Commissioners' church, situated on the corner of Cheetham Hill Road and Smedley Lane. The building was completed in 1839, using ashlar, to a Perpendicular Gothic design by T. W. Atkinson. Construction had commenced in 1836.

A wealthy local resident and enthusiastic amateur musician, J. W. Fraser, commissioned William Hill to design and install a three-manual church organ in the German System style. This was completed in 1840. Mendelssohn gave a recital using this instrument in April 1847.

Although now mostly derelict, the tower and west end of the aisles and vestry survive and are classified as a Grade II listed building.

See also 
List of churches in Greater Manchester
List of Commissioners' churches in Northeast and Northwest England

References

External links 

1839 establishments in England
Disestablishments in England
Former churches in Greater Manchester
Churches completed in 1839
Manchester
Manchester
19th-century Church of England church buildings
Gothic Revival church buildings in England
Gothic Revival architecture in Greater Manchester
Commissioners' church buildings
Grade II listed buildings in Manchester